is a private university in Kitakyushu, Fukuoka, Japan, established in 2001.

External links
 Official website 

Educational institutions established in 2001
Private universities and colleges in Japan
Universities and colleges in Fukuoka Prefecture
2001 establishments in Japan